Structured data analysis is the statistical data analysis of structured data. This can arise either in the form of an a priori structure such as multiple-choice questionnaires or in situations with the need to search for structure that fits the given data, either exactly or approximately. This structure can then be used for making comparisons, predictions, manipulations etc.

Types of structured data analysis
Algebraic data analysis
Bayesian analysis
Cluster analysis
Combinatorial data analysis
Formal concept analysis
Functional data analysis
Geometric data analysis
Regression analysis
Shape analysis
Topological data analysis
Tree structured data analysis

References

Further reading 
 
 
 Leland Wilkinson, (1992) Tree Structured Data Analysis: AID, CHAID and CART

Statistical analysis
Structure